Pierre Joseph Étienne Finck (1797-1870) was a French mathematician.

Life and work 
Finck, who became orphan at twelve years, was educated by a merchant of Landau (Pfalz). In 1815, he entered in the École Polytechnique, where he graduated in 1817. After some time studying in the Artillery School, he left París for Strasbourg before 1821.

From 1825 he was professor in the Artillery School of Strasburg and, simultaneously, professor of special mathematics in the Collége de Strasbourg. In 1842 he was appointed adjunct professor of applied mathematics in the University of Strasbourg where he was appointed full professor in 1847.

From 1862 he began to suffer from ill health. He was intellectually diminished, and he was forced to take sick leave in 1866. He retired in 1868.

Finck wrote seven text books on algebra, geometry, mechanics and calculus, and more than twenty articles published in the Journal de Mathematiques Pures et Appliquees, in the Annales de Gergone and in the Comptes rendus of the French Academy of Sciences.

References

Bibliography

External links 
 

1797 births
1870 deaths
19th-century French people
19th-century French mathematicians
École Polytechnique alumni
People from Lauterbourg
Academic staff of the University of Strasbourg